Marie-Christine Verdier-Jouclas (born 19 March 1965) is a French politician representing La République En Marche! She was elected to the French National Assembly on 18 June 2017, representing the department of Tarn.

Political career
In parliament, Verdier-Jouclas serves on the Finance Committee. She is also a member of the parliamentary friendship groups with Gabon, Jamaica and Morocco.

In addition to her committee assignments, Verdier-Jouclas has been a member of the French delegation to the Parliamentary Assembly of the Council of Europe since 2017. In this capacity, she serves on the Committee on Migration, Refugees and Displaced Persons and the Sub-Committee on Integration. She has been the Assembly’s rapporteur on disaster preparedness since 2019.

Since 2019, Verdier-Jouclas has been serving as one of her parliamentary group's spokespersons under the leadership of its chairman Gilles Le Gendre.

Political positions
In May 2018, Verdier-Jouclas co-sponsored an initiative in favour of a bioethics law extending to homosexual and single women free access to fertility treatments such as in vitro fertilisation (IVF) under France's national health insurance; it was one of the campaign promises of President Emmanuel Macron and marked the first major social reform of his five-year term. 

In September 2018, following the appointment of François de Rugy to the government, Verdier-Jouclas supported the candidacy of Richard Ferrand as president of the National Assembly.

See also
 2017 French legislative election

References

1965 births
Living people
Deputies of the 15th National Assembly of the French Fifth Republic
La République En Marche! politicians
21st-century French women politicians
Place of birth missing (living people)
Women members of the National Assembly (France)